Aframomum pruinosum is a species of plant in the ginger family, Zingiberaceae. It was first described by François Gagnepain.

References 

pruinosum